Irkutsky (masculine), Irkutskaya (feminine), or Irkutskoye (neuter) is the name of several rural localities in Russia:
Irkutsky (rural locality), a settlement in Nikolayevsky Selsoviet of Mikhaylovsky District of Altai Krai
Irkutskoye, Kaliningrad Oblast, a settlement in Kovrovsky Rural Okrug of Zelenogradsky District of Kaliningrad Oblast
Irkutskoye, Krasnoyarsk Krai, a selo in Minderlinsky Selsoviet of Sukhobuzimsky District of Krasnoyarsk Krai